Obadiah is a Biblical prophet whose name means "servant of Yahweh" or "worshipper of Yahweh".

Obadiah may also refer to:
 Obadiah (given name), including a list of biblical figures, people and fictional characters
 Obadiah Parker, stage name of American singer-songwriter Mat Weddle (born 1983)
 Book of Obadiah, a book of the Hebrew Bible
 Obadiah (Abarat), a fictional place in Abarat by Clive Barker
 Obadiah (album), a 2010 album by Frazey Ford
 Obadiah School of the Bible, a school in Bethel, Pennsylvania, maintained by the Assemblies of Yahweh

See also
Ovadia, a given name and surname